Erik Björnsson was supposedly one of the sons of Björn Ironside and a legendary king of Sweden of the  House of Munsö, who would have lived in the late 9th century. One of the few surviving Scandinavian sources that deal with Swedish kings from this time is Hervarar saga. The saga is from the 12th or 13th century and is thus not considered a reliable historical source for the 9th century. It says:

Notes and references

See also
Early Swedish History

Semi-legendary kings of Sweden
9th-century rulers in Europe
House of Munsö
9th-century Swedish people